The Herpesvirales is an order of dsDNA viruses (Baltimore group I) with animal hosts, characterised by a common morphology consisting of an icosahedral capsid enclosed in a glycoprotein-containing lipid envelope. Common infections in humans caused by members of this order include cold sores, genital herpes, chickenpox, shingles, and glandular fever. Herpesvirales is the sole order in the class Herviviricetes, which is the sole class in the phylum Peploviricota.

Virology

Morphology 
All members of the order have a virion structure that consists of a DNA core surrounded by an icosahedral capsid composed of 12 pentavalent and 150 hexavalent capsomeres (T = 16). The capsid has a diameter of ~110  nanometers (nm) and is embedded in a proteinaceous matrix called the tegument, which in its turn is enclosed by a glycoprotein-containing lipid envelope with a diameter of about 200 nm. The DNA genome is linear and double stranded, with sizes in the range 125–290 kbp. The genome contains terminal and internal reiterated sequences, with their number and disposition varying depending on the different subclades.

Hosts 

All species in this order have animal hosts. The Malacoherpesviridae infect molluscs (abalone and oysters), the Alloherpesviridae infect anamniotes (frogs and fish), and the Herpesviridae infect amniotes (reptiles, birds, and mammals). Within the family Herpesviridae, genera Iltovirus and Mardivirus, and genus Scutavirus of the subfamily Alphaherpesvirinae infect birds and reptiles, respectively. All other genera in the Herpesviridae infect mammals only.

Taxonomy 
As of 2020, the order is made up of three families, three subfamilies, 23 genera, and 130 species. The taxonomy is shown from family, to subfamily, to genus below.

 Alloherpesviridae
 Batrachovirus
 Cyprinivirus
 Ictalurivirus
 Salmonivirus
 Herpesviridae
 Alphaherpesvirinae
 Iltovirus
 Mardivirus
 Scutavirus
 Simplexvirus
 Varicellovirus
 Betaherpesvirinae
 Cytomegalovirus
 Muromegalovirus
 Proboscivirus
 Quwivirus
 Roseolovirus
 Gammaherpesvirinae
 Bossavirus
 Lymphocryptovirus
 Macavirus
 Manticavirus
 Patagivirus
 Percavirus
 Rhadinovirus
 Malacoherpesviridae
 Aurivirus
 Ostreavirus

History 
The herpesvirus was first isolated from the blue wildebeest in 1960 by veterinary scientist Walter Plowright. The genus Herpesvirus was established in 1971 in the first report of the International Committee on Taxonomy of Viruses (ICTV). This genus  consisted of 23 viruses and 4 groups of viruses. In the second ICTV report in 1976 this genus was elevated to family level - the Herpetoviridae. Because of possible confusion with viruses derived from reptiles this name was changed in the third report in 1979 to Herpesviridae. In this report the family Herpesviridae was divided into 3 subfamilies (Alphaherpesvirinae, Betaherpesvirinae and Gammaherpesvirinae) and 5 unnamed genera: 21 viruses were listed. In 2009 the family Herpesviridae was elevated to the order Herpesvirales. This elevation was necessitated by the discovery that the herpesviruses of fish and molluscs were only distantly related to those of birds and mammals. Two new families were created - the family Alloherpesviridae which incorporates bony fish and frog viruses and the family Malacoherpesviridae which contains those of molluscs.

Phylogenetics 
The only protein with widespread conservation amongst all members of the order, albeit only at the amino-acid level, is the ATPase subunit of the DNA terminase; the latter is involved in the packaging of the DNA during virion assembly.

Phylogenies constructed with the conserved regions of the ATPase subunit of the DNA terminase suggest that Alloherpesviridae is the basal clade of the order, and that Herpesviridae and Malacoherpesviridae are sister clades. Given the phylogenetic distances between vertebrates and molluscs, this suggests that herpesviruses were initially fish viruses and that they have evolved with their hosts to infect other vertebrates.

Species nomenclature 
The Herpesvirales naming system originated in 1973 and has been elaborated considerably since. All herpesviruses described since this system was adopted have been named in accordance with it. The recommended naming system specifies that each species name consists of three parts: a first word, a second word, and finally a number.

The first word should be derived from the taxon (family or subfamily) to which its primary natural host belongs. The subfamily name is used for viruses from members of the family Bovidae or from primates (the virus name ending in –ine, e.g. bovine), and the host family name for other viruses (ending in –id, e.g. equid). Human herpesviruses have been treated as an exception (human rather than hominid). Following the host-derived term, species in the family Herpesviridae, which are divided into subfamilies Alphaherpesvirinae, Betaherpesvirinae, and Gammaherpesvirinae, will have the word alphaherpesvirus, betaherpesvirus, or gammaherpesvirus added, respectively. Species in the Herpesviridae that have not been assigned to a subfamily, and species in Alloherpesviridae and Malacoherpesviridae will have herpesvirus following the host-derived term instead. Finally an Arabic number (1, 2, 3, and so forth) is appended. Numbers are assigned in order of naming and bear no implied meaning about the taxonomic or biological properties of the virus.

An example of such a name is Canid alphaherpesvirus 1. From this name it can be ascertained that the virus' primary natural host is a canid (i.e. a member of the family Canidae; dogs etc.), that it is a member of the family Herpesviridae and subfamily Alphaherpesvirinae, and that it is the first herpesvirus named for which canids serve as primary natural hosts.

A number of virus names (e.g. Epstein–Barr virus, also known as Human gammaherpesvirus 4) are so widely used that it may be impractical to attempt to insist on their replacement. This has led to a dual nomenclature in the literature for some herpesviruses.

References

External links

 ICTV Accepted Taxonomic Proposals from the Herpesviridae Study Group (2003–2005) 

 
Virus orders